Estádio do Chingale is a multi-purpose stadium in Tete, Mozambique.  It is currently used mostly for football matches and is the home stadium of Chingale de Tete.  The stadium holds 5,000 people.

Chingale
Multi-purpose stadiums in Mozambique
Tete, Mozambique
Buildings and structures in Tete Province